Jack Kelly is an American politician. He is a former Republican member of the Philadelphia City Council.

Kelly originally represented the seventh district on the council. In 1987, he defeated Democratic incumbent Patricia Harris for the seat, but he was defeated in his bid for reelection four years later by Daniel McElhatton.

Following the death of longtime Republican councilman Thacher Longstreth, Kelly was elected to his at-large seat and served from 2004 to 2012.

References

Year of birth missing (living people)
Living people
Philadelphia City Council members
Pennsylvania Republicans